Garra kalakadensis is described from Kalakad Wildlife Sanctuary, Tirunelveli district, Tamil Nadu and compared with the widely distributed G. mullya (Sykes) and the North Indian form G. lamta (Hamilton). Representative specimens from six different altitudes in two localities (N. E~ & S. W.) are compared. A key to the species of Garra from peninsular India is given.

Garra kalakadensis is a species of cyprinid fish in the genus Garra which is endemic to the Western Ghats in India.

References 

 K. Rema Devi . 1993. Garra kalakadensis, a New Cyprinid Fish from Kalakad Wildlife Sanctuary, Tirunelveli District, Tamil Nadu. '' http://recordsofzsi.com/index.php/zsoi/article/view/160947

kalakadensis
Cyprinid fish of Asia
Taxa named by Karunakaran Rema Devi
Fish described in 1993